Valentina Bonariva (born 1 May 1989) is an Italian dancer, model and beauty pageant titleholder who was crowned Miss Universo Italia 2014 and represented her country at Miss Universe 2014 and placed Top 15.

Early life 
Bonariva is a dancer. She was FIDS (Italian Dance Sport Federation).

Pageantry

Miss Italia 2013
Bonariva represented Tuscany at Miss Italia 2013 and awarded as Miss Fair Play.

Miss Universo Italia 2014
Bonariva was crowned as Miss Universo Italia 2014 on 23 November 2014.

Miss Universe 2014
Bonariva represented Italy at Miss Universe 2014. She was placed in the Top 15.

References

External links 

Sito ufficiale di Miss Universo Italia

1989 births
Living people
Italian female models
Miss Universe 2014 contestants
Italian beauty pageant winners
Dancers from Milan